Vizos (Gascon: Visòs) is a former commune in the Hautes-Pyrénées department in south-western France. On 1 January 2017, it was merged into the commune Saligos.

See also
Communes of the Hautes-Pyrénées department

References

Former communes of Hautes-Pyrénées